Francisco Álvarez (born 26 February 2000) is an Argentine professional footballer who plays as a centre-back for Patronato, on loan from Talleres de Córdoba.

Career

Club
Álvarez's career began with San Martín in 2013, initially featuring for their youth squads. He first made a teamsheet for the first-team in June 2017, when he was an unused substitute for a Copa Argentina defeat to Atlanta. As he was for an Argentine Primera División match with Tigre on 5 February 2018, which preceded his professional debut on 12 February during a league loss away to Atlético Tucumán.

In January 2022, Álvarez joined Argentine Primera División club Talleres de Córdoba on a deal until the end of 2026. On 5 June 2022, to get some more playing time, Álvarez joined fellow league club Patronato on loan for one year.

International
Álvarez was selected to train with the Argentina U20s in 2018, including against the senior team in March.

Career statistics
.

References

External links

2000 births
Living people
Argentine footballers
Association football defenders
Argentine Primera División players
San Martín de San Juan footballers
Talleres de Córdoba footballers
Club Atlético Patronato footballers